St Xavier's School, founded in 1940, is a co-educational school recognized by the Government of Karnataka and administered by National University of Educational Planning and Administration which caters to students of all communities. This school is located at B.C. 149, Camp, Belagavi.

The school administration is divided into:
 Pre-Primary School (Kindergarten I and II)
 Primary School (Grades I to VII)
 Secondary School (Grades VIII to X)
 Pre- University College (Grades XI and XII)

The school participates in football, cricket and athletics. It also has its own School Band.

The school has a House system with students of each house being represented by the colors Gold, Blue, Green and Red. It also follows a Parliamentary System made up of and run by the students themselves.

References

Schools in Belagavi district